Janne Korhonen (born 28 November 1979) is a Finnish professional football goalkeeper who currently plays for Ykkönen side JJK Jyväskylä. During years 1999–2008 he played for first division side MYPA. On 30 April 2010 he was selected as the Player of The Month in Veikkausliiga. 

Due to his good performances in Veikkausliiga, he was the Finland national team choice against Belgium as a third choice goalkeeper by the national team coach Stuart Baxter.

References

 Guardian Football

External links
  Veikkausliiga profile

1979 births
Living people
Sportspeople from Jyväskylä
Finnish footballers
Veikkausliiga players
Myllykosken Pallo −47 players
FC Haka players
JJK Jyväskylä players
Association football goalkeepers